The Church of Our Most Merciful Saviour, also known as the Santee Mission, built in 1884, is a historic Carpenter Gothic style Episcopal church located on the Missouri River in the Santee Indian Reservation in Santee, Nebraska. Although its side windows are not arched, it otherwise exhibits all the common features of Carpenter Gothic churches: board and batten siding, lancet windows on the front along with a circular rosette window, belfry tower on the side and main entrance on the side though the belfry tower.

On March 16, 1972, it was added to the National Register of Historic Places as the Episcopal Church.

It is one of two churches in Nebraska included in the Santee Mission of the Episcopal Diocese of South Dakota. It is served by the Rev. Patricia White Horse Carda.

See also

Congregational Church and Manse (Santee, Nebraska), built 1870–71, also NRHP-listed in Santee

References

External links
 Diocese of South Dakota recent photo of church

Churches on the National Register of Historic Places in Nebraska
Churches completed in 1884
19th-century Episcopal church buildings
Episcopal church buildings in Nebraska
Carpenter Gothic church buildings in Nebraska
Buildings and structures in Knox County, Nebraska
National Register of Historic Places in Knox County, Nebraska